The Aleksandër Moisiu Theatre, or called also Durrës Theatre is a theatre in the city centre of Durrës, Albania. The theatre took its name from Austrian actor Alexander Moissi, who was of Albanian descent.

History
The building of the theatre dates from the 1950s. It officially opened on 11 January 1953. His first show was the comedy "The Girl from the village" the writer Fatmir Gjata, staged by director Pandi Stillu.

Drejtoret ne vite / Theater Directors

Notes and references

See also
 List of theatres in Albania

Buildings and structures in Durrës
Theatres in Albania
Tourist attractions in Durrës County
Theatres completed in 1953
1953 establishments in Albania